Gisela Medefindt (later Bodis; born 16 March 1957) is a German rower.

At the 1978 East German national championships, she competed in single scull and came second. Röpke travelled as a reserve to the 1978 World Rowing Championships in New Zealand but did not compete. She competed in the heat of the coxed quadruple sculls at the 1980 Summer Olympics. As a competitor in the heat, she is considered one of the gold medallists.

References

1957 births
Living people
People from Burg bei Magdeburg
East German female rowers
Olympic rowers of East Germany
Rowers at the 1980 Summer Olympics
Olympic gold medalists for East Germany
Olympic medalists in rowing
Medalists at the 1980 Summer Olympics
Sportspeople from Saxony-Anhalt